McKinnon Secondary College is a public secondary school located in the Melbourne suburb of McKinnon. The school was ranked 62nd in Victoria in terms of VCE median study score in 2012. In February 2022, the school opened a second campus located in Bentleigh East to be designated to Year 8 and Year 9 students. This new campus was officially dubbed the East Campus. Pizza Binnion, the principal, is retiring at the end of 2022, with Mr Korn becoming the new principal.

Overview 
McKinnon Secondary College is a coeducational secondary school, serving years 7–12, is located in McKinnon, Melbourne Southern Suburbs & Western Port region of Victoria. It is one of the government schools in the McKinnon area. Mckinnon Secondary College offers VET and VCAL courses. The uniform is compulsory and enforced.

Facilities 

 Assembly Hall
 Gymnasium with mezzanine, and weights room
 Music Centre with auditorium and five music studios
 McKinnon Resource Centre, including Library
 McKinnon Exploration Research Centre (MERC)
 Senior Block, commonly used by year 11s and year 12s (3 Levels)
 McKinnon Year Seven Transition centre(opened 2013)
 Lecture Theatre with 250 seats, named the Alan Lawrence Lecture Theatre after a long-serving ex-principal
 Art/science/technology wing 
 Korean garden with pond
 Canteen
 Multicourts
 New Second Gym at the back of the school (opened 2022)
 Two Large Ovals (With Soccer goals, AFL Goals and Cricket pitch)

The school previously held numerous PC and Mac computer labs, although this number has been reduced following the introduction of the school's Chromebook program, under which all students in the school are equipped with individual  Chromebooks.

VCE results
McKinnon Secondary College is consistently in the top non-selective government schools in Victoria for the last decade, and in 2003 was the state system's second top non-selective-entry VCE school. In 2011 it was ranked 62nd in the state out of all schools. McKinnon Secondary College was ranked eighth out of all state secondary schools in Victoria based on VCE results in 2018.

Music 
McKinnon Secondary has many instrumental groups that cater for people of different ability, instrument and music style preferences.

The colleges music ensembles include:

 Years 7 and 8 band
 Years 7 and 8 Strings
 Symphonic wind band
 Ovenden Band
 Intermediate Stage Band
 Senior Stage Band
 Orchestra
 Wind quintet
 Saxophone Ensemble
 String quartet
 Percussion ensemble
 Choir
 Senior singers

The music faculty at McKinnon holds many performances such as the Spring and junior concerts. An event considered important in the school calendar is the Winter Concert, held annually at Robert Blackwood Hall, in Monash University. The college also produces a musical every second year. The most recent musical to be performed by the college was 'The Addams Family'. Five shows were performed from 21 to 24 June 2017. Previous musicals in recent years include 'Little Shop of Horrors' in 2015, 'Zombie Prom' in 2013, 'The Wiz' in 2011, and 'Hot Mikado' in 2009.

Languages
McKinnon Secondary offers four languages, German, Spanish and French. The school previously taught Korean.

It is compulsory for students in years 7 and 8 to learn a language. The college also hosts the Victorian School of Languages, which allows students to learn a language out of school in their own time as a subject for VCE. The VSL offers both Hebrew and Russian. This enables McKinnon students to learn another language, or their native language, as part of their VCE. Year 10 students have the opportunity to go on exchange trips to either (Germany) or France and have an exchange student live with them for a period of time. Since 2022, Mckinnon has added the opportunity to learn Spanish, with two dedicated teachers. Before this, Spanish was an option in year 9 as an elective, but wasn't popular. Spots are limited.

Enhancement program 
The college offers an enhanced maths and science program for selected students called ELMS. It runs until year 9, then after all ELMS students are enrolled into Year 11 Math Methods.
The ELMS program runs from year 7-9, with year 10 students completing unit 1-2 VCE subjects

Sports carnivals 
McKinnon Secondary holds sports carnivals throughout the year where students can compete for their houses (Chisholm, Monash, Gargamele and Flynn). But due to covid 2 carnivals were canceled (swimming, athletics 2021). The three carnivals are swimming, athletics and cross-country. Students who win, or do well, in these competitions go on to represent McKinnon at inter-school sporting events.

Extra curricular activities 
McKinnon Secondary offers activities including: 
 Tournament of Minds
 Inter-school debating
 Philosophy Club and annual state Philosothon
 Sceptical Society
 Code Club
Knitting club
Chess Club
Retro Games club

Uniform 
Students are required to wear a uniform.
The uniform policy is enforced by teachers. The colours of the uniform are blue, grey and white.
There are two types of Uniform, Sport uniform and regular uniform.
Sport uniform can only be worn on days when students have practical PE lessons, or interschool sport. During Term 2 and 3, blazers must be worn to and from school each day when not wearing sport uniform.

Alumni
 Sarah Aarons, songwriter
 Harry James Angus, musician of The Cat Empire
 Sarah Dollard, screenwriter
 Max Gawn, AFL footballer
 James Frecheville, actor
 Danielle Matthews, singer
 James Paterson, Australian politician who has been a Senator for Victoria since 2016, representing the Liberal Party
 Lewis Spears, Comedian and ex-radio host
 Rick Springfield, Australian-American musician and actor

References

External links
Official Website
 Victorian Government Schools
 School Newsletter

Public high schools in Melbourne
Educational institutions established in 1955
1955 establishments in Australia
Buildings and structures in the City of Glen Eira